Giuseppe Tucci (5 June 1894 – 5 April 1984) was an Italian orientalist, Indologist and scholar of East Asian studies, specializing in Tibetan culture and the history of Buddhism. During its zenith, Tucci was a supporter of Italian fascism, and he used idealized portrayals of Asian traditions to support Italian ideological campaigns. Tucci was fluent in several European languages, Sanskrit, Bengali, Pali, Prakrit, Chinese and Tibetan and he taught at the University of Rome La Sapienza until his death. He is considered one of the founders of the field of Buddhist Studies.

Life and work

Education and background
He was born to a middle-class Italian family (from Apulia) in Macerata, Marche, and thrived academically. He taught himself Hebrew, Chinese and Sanskrit before even going to university and in 1911, aged only 18, he published a collection of Latin inscriptions in the prestigious Zeitschrift des Deutschen Archäologischen Instituts. He completed his studies  at the University of Rome in 1919, where his studies were repeatedly interrupted as a result of World War I.

After graduating, he traveled to India and settled down at the Visva-Bharati University, founded by the Bengali poet and Nobel Laureate, Rabindranath Tagore. There he studied Buddhism, Tibetan and Bengali, and also taught Italian and Chinese. He also studied and taught at Dhaka University, the University of Benares and Calcutta University. He remained in India until 1931, when he returned to Italy.

Scholarship and reputation

He was Italy's foremost scholar of the East, with such diverse research interests ranging from ancient Iranian religion to Indian and Chinese philosophy. He taught primarily at the University of Rome but was a visiting scholar at institutions throughout Europe and Asia. In 1931, the University of Naples "L'Orientale" made him its first Chair of Chinese Language and Literature. In 1933 he promoted the foundation the  - IsMEO (Istituto italiano per il Medio ed Estremo Oriente), based in Rome. The IsMEO was established as a "Moral body directly depending on Mussolini". Until 1945, when the IsMEO was closed, Gentile was its President and Tucci was its Managing Vice-President and, later, Director of the courses of languages.

Tucci officially visited Japan for the first time in November 1936, and remained there for over two months until January 1937, when he attended at the opening of the Italian-Japanese Institute (Istituto Italo-nipponico) in Tokyo. Tucci traveled all over Japan giving lectures on Tibet and "racial purity".

He organised several pioneering archaeological digs throughout Asia, such as in Swat in Pakistan, Ghazni in Afghanistan, Persepolis in Iran and in the Himalayas. He was also the promoter of the National Museum of Oriental Art. In 1978 he received the Jawaharlal Nehru Award for International Understanding, in 1979 the Balzan Prize for History (ex aequo with Ernest Labrousse). During the course of his life, he wrote over 360 books and articles.

Politics
Tucci was a supporter of Italian Fascism and Benito Mussolini. His collaboration began in his student days at the University of Rome, where he first met Giovanni Gentile (at the time, Professor of the History of Philosophy and already a close friend and collaborator of Mussolini), and continued right up to Gentile's assassination in 1944, which led to the forced closure of IsMEO for over two years until 1947. In November  1936 - January 1937 he was the representative of Mussolini in Japan, where he was sent to improve the diplomatic relations between Italy and Japan and to make Fascist propaganda. On 27 April 1937 he gave a speech on the radio in Japanese on Mussolini's behalf. In this country his action paved the way to the inclusion of Italy to the Anti-Comintern Pact (6 November 1937). Tucci was a member of the editorial board of an Italian propaganda magazine, Yamato, which was started in 1941 to improve the political alliance of Italy and Japan.

He wrote popular articles for the Italian state that decried the rationalism of industrialized 1930s-1940s Europe and expressed a yearning for a more authentic existence in touch with nature, which he claimed could be found in Asia. According to the Tibetologist Donald S. Lopez, "For Tucci, Tibet was an ecological paradise and timeless utopia into which industrialized Europe figuratively could escape and find peace, a cure for western ills, and from which Europe could find its own pristine past to which to return." Hugh Richardson and David Snellgrove in the dedication of their 1968 book of A Cultural History of Tibet wrote, "To Giuseppe Tucci who has revealed so many hidden treasures of Tibet life, art and learning." A fictional Tucci, played by Marcel Iureș, appears as a character in Francis Ford Coppola's 2007 film Youth Without Youth.

Death
Tucci died in San Polo dei Cavalieri, near Rome, in 1984.

Biography
The only biography on Tucci is by Enrica Garzilli, L'esploratore del Duce. Le avventure di Giuseppe Tucci e la politica italiana in Oriente da Mussolini a Andreotti. Con il carteggio di Giulio Andreotti, Roma/Milano: Memori, Asiatica, 2012 (3rd ed. 2014), 2 vols.; vol. 1, pp. lii+685, ; vol. 2, pp. xiv + 724 .

Selected bibliography
 Indo-tibetica 1: Mc'od rten e ts'a ts'a nel Tibet indiano ed occidentale: contributo allo studio dell'arte religiosa tibetana e del suo significato, Roma, Reale Accademia d'Italia, 1932 (Chinese transl.:《梵天佛地 1: 西北印度和西藏西部的塔和擦擦——试论藏族宗教艺术及其意义》, 魏正中 萨尔吉 主编. 上海, 上海古籍出版社, 2009);
 Indo-tibetica 2: Rin c'en bzan po e la rinascita del buddhismo nel Tibet intorno al Mille, Roma, Reale Accademia d'Italia, 1933 (English transl.: Rin-chen-bzan-po and the renaissance of Buddhism in Tibet around the millennium, New Delhi, Aditya Prakashan, [1988]; Chinese transl.:《梵天佛地 2: 仁钦桑波及公元1000年左右藏传佛教的复兴》, 魏正中 萨尔吉 主编. 上海, 上海古籍出版社, 2009);
 (with E. Ghersi) Cronaca della missione scientifica Tucci nel Tibet occidentale (1933), Roma, Reale Accademia d'Italia, 1934 (English transl.: Secrets of Tibet. Being the chronicle of the Tucci Scientific Expedition to Western Tibet, 1933, London & Glasgow, Blackie & Son, 1935);
 Indo-tibetica 3 : I templi del Tibet occidentale e il loro simbolismo artistico, 2 vols, Roma, Reale Accademia d'Italia, 1935-1936 (Chinese transl.:《梵天佛地 3: 西藏西部的寺院及其艺术象征》, 魏正中 萨尔吉 主编. 上海, 上海古籍出版社, 2009);
 Santi e briganti nel Tibet ignoto: diario della spedizione nel Tibet occidentale 1935, Milano, U. Hoepli, 1937;
 Indo-tibetica 4: Gyantse ed i suoi monasteri, 3 vols, Roma, Reale Accademia d'Italia, 1941 (English transl.: Gyantse and its monasteries, New Delhi, Aditya Prakashan, 1989; Chinese transl.:《梵天佛地 4: 江孜及其寺院》, 魏正中 萨尔吉 主编. 上海, 上海古籍出版社, 2009);
 Asia religiosa, Roma, Partenia, 1946;
  Tibetan Painted Scrolls, 3 vols, Roma, Istituto Poligrafico e Zecca dello Stato, 1949;
 Teoria e pratica del Mandala, Roma, Astrolabio, 1949 (English transl.: The theory and practice of the Mandala, London, Rider and Co., 1961);
 Italia e Oriente, Milano, Garzanti, 1949;
 Tibetan folksongs from the district of Gyantse, Ascona, Artibus Asiae, 1949; 2nd rev. ed. 1966;
 The Tombs of the Tibetan Kings, Roma, IsMEO, 1950;
 A Lhasa e oltre, Roma, La Libreria dello Stato, 1950 (English transl.: To Lhasa and beyond, Roma, La Libreria dello Stato, 1956);
 Tra giungle e pagode, Roma, La Libreria dello Stato, 1953;
 Preliminary report on two scientific expeditions in Nepal, Roma, IsMEO, 1956;
 Storia della filosofia indiana, Bari, Laterza, 1957;
 Nepal: alla scoperta dei Malla, Bari, Leonardo da Vinci, 1960 (English transl.: Nepal. The discovery of the Malla, London, George Allen & Unwin, 1962);
 Die Religionen Tibets in G. Tucci and W. Heissig, Die Religionen Tibets und der Mongolei, Stuttgart, Kohlhammer Verlag, 1970  (English transl.: The religions of Tibet, London, Routledge & Kegan Paul, 1980).
 " Tibet. Land of Snows" Translated by J. E. Stapleton Driver. Oxford & IBH PublishingCo., Calcutta. Bombay. New Delhi.

Footnotes

References

 Federico Chitarin, "Le imprese di Giuseppe Tucci, l'Indiana Jones di Mussolini", in Memori Mese-Mensile, October 2012. 
 Alice Crisanti, "Il memoriale di Giuseppe Tucci", Quaderni di storia 81 (2015), pp. 267–75. 
 Davide Brullo, "“Era superbo e geniale, portò l’Italia fascista in Tibet, India e Giappone – ma Mussolini lo guardava con sospetto. Fu aiutato da Andreotti, in troppi lo hanno invidiato”: Enrica Garzilli ci racconta Giuseppe Tucci", in Pangea, 23 gennaio 2019. 
 Enrica Garzilli, L'esploratore del Duce. Le avventure di Giuseppe Tucci e la politica italiana in Oriente da Mussolini a Andreotti. Con il carteggio di Giulio Andreotti, Roma/Milano: Memori, Asiatica, 2012 (3rd ed. 2014), 2 vols.; vol. 1, pp. lii+685, ; vol. 2, pp. xiv + 724 .
 Enrica Garzilli, Mussolini's Explorer: The Adventures of Giuseppe Tucci and Italian Policy in the Orient from Mussolini to Andreotti. With the Correspondence of Giulio Andreotti (Volume 1), (riv. and enlarged version of the first 2 chapters of L'esploratore del Duce. Le avventure di Giuseppe Tucci.., cit.), Milano: Asiatica, 2016, pp. liii+332, .
 Enrica Garzilli, "Opportunista, scaltro, geniale. Elogio di Giuseppe Tucci, il nostro Indiana Jones tra Tibet, Afghanistan e Oriente estremo", in Pangea, September 3, 1921. 
 Enrica Garzilli, "Un grande maceratese che andò lontano: Giuseppe Tucci, le Marche e l'Oriente / A Great Man from Macerata Who Went Far: Giuseppe Tucci, the Marches Region and the East" English version and Italian version, in Identità Sibillina, Year 2006 -n. 2. 
 Enrica Garzilli "L’esploratore dell’Oriente: Giuseppe Tucci ", in Il Sole 24 Ore-Ispirazione, 15 Nov. 2007.
 Enrica Garzilli, "Giuseppe Tucci: l’Indiana Jones italiano", in L’Illustrazione italiana, Year 3, N. 1, pp. 84–86.
 Enrica Garzilli, "Giuseppe Tucci, l’orientalista italiano diventato una leggenda: una sola passione, l’Asia", in EUR. La città nella città, 22 July 2010. 
 Enrica Garzilli, "L'esploratore dell'Oriente: Giuseppe Tucci ", in Il Sole 24 Ore-Ispirazione, 15 Nov. 2011.
 Enrica Garzilli, "A Sanskrit Letter Written by Sylvain Lévi in 1923 to Hemarāja Śarmā Along With Some Hitherto Unknown Biographical Notes (Cultural Nationalism and Internationalism in the First Half of the 21st Cent.: Famous Indologists Write to the Raj Guru of Nepal – no. 1)" in Commemorative Volume for 30 Years of the Nepal-German Manuscript Preservation Project, Journal of the Nepal Research Centre, vol. 12 (Kathmandu, 2001), ed. by A. Wezler in collaboration with H. Haffner, A. Michaels, B. Kölver, M. R. Pant and D. Jackson, pp. 115–149 (on Tucci's guru, the Nepalese Hemarāja Śarmā).
 Enrica Garzilli, "A Sanskrit Letter Written by Sylvain Lévy in 1925 to Hemarāja Śarmā along with Some Hitherto Unknown Biographical Notes (Cultural Nationalism and Internationalism in the First Half of the 20th Century – Famous Indologists write to the Raj Guru of Nepal – No. 2)", in History of Indological Studies. Papers of the 12th World Sanskrit Conference Vol. 11.2, ed. by K. Karttunen, P. Koskikallio and A. Parpola, Motilal Banarsidass and University of Helsinki, Delhi 2015, pp. 17–53.
 Raniero Gnoli, Ricordo di Giuseppe Tucci, Roma, IsMEO, 1985;
 Giuseppe Tucci: Commemorazione tenuta dal Presidente dell'Istituto Gherardo Gnoli il 7 maggio 1984 a Palazzo Brancaccio, Roma, IsMEO, 1984;
 Giuseppe Tucci nel centenario della nascita : Roma, 7-8 giugno 1994, a cura di Beniamino Melasecchi, Roma, IsMEO, 1995;
 Giuseppe Tucci : Un maceratese nelle terre sacre dell'Oriente, Macerata, Comune di Macerata, 2000;
 Tucci l'esploratore dell'anima, Catalogue of the Exhibition, Pollenza, Arte Nomade, 2004 (in Italian and English);
 "Concetto Guttuso intervistato da Oscar Nalesini", Il Giornale del Museo Nazionale d'Arte Orientale, n. 3, 2008, pp. 7–8 (sul viaggio in Nepal del 1952), now also on-line ;
Hans Thomas Hakl, "Giuseppe Tucci entre études orientales, ésoterisme et Fascisme (1894–1984)", Politica Hermetica Nr. 18, Lausanne, L’Age d’Homme, 2004, p. 119–136. 
 Oscar Nalesini, "Assembling loose pages, gathering fragments of the past: Giuseppe Tucci and his wanderings throughout Tibet and the Himalayas, 1926-1954", in Sanskrit Texts from Giuseppe Tucci's Collection Part I, Ed. by F. Sferra, Roma, IsIAO, 2008, pp. 79–112 (Manuscripta buddhica, 1);
 Oscar Nalesini, "Ghersi e gli altri. I fotografi delle spedizioni Tucci". In Eugenio Ghersi, un marinaio ligure in Tibet, a cura di D. Bellatalla, C. A. Gemignani, L. Rossi. Genova, SAGEP, 2008, pp. 53–60;
 Oscar Nalesini, "A short history of the Tibetan explorations of Giuseppe Tucci", in Visibilia invisibilium. Non-invasive analyses on Tibetan paintings from the Tucci expeditions, ed. by M. Laurenzi Tabasso. M.A. Polichetti, C. Seccaroni. Orientalis Publications, 2011, pp. 17–28;
 Oscar Nalesini, "Il carteggio Moise-Tucci sulla spedizione tibetana del 1948 (The Moise-Tucci correspondence on the Tibetan expedition of 1948)", in Miscellanea di storia delle esplorazioni 37 (2012), pp. 115–61;
 O. Nalesini, "Felice Boffa Ballaran, diarista, fotografo e cartografo della spedizione italiana in Tibet del 1939", in Miscellanea di storia delle esplorazioni 38 (2013), pp. 267–309.

External links
 Il Duce's Explorer. The Adventures of Giuseppe Tucci . Blog in English including unedited documents such as his letters to Mussolini, to the Royal Preceptor of Nepal and to Giulio Andreotti, and documents on his relationship with Gandhi, Tagore, Giovanni Gentile, Karl Houshofer, Mircea Eliade, and so on.
 Giuseppe Tucci: Life, Travels and Adventures of the Explorer of Fascism : Blog in Italian including unedited documents such as his letters to Mussolini, to the Royal Preceptor of Nepal and to Giulio Andreotti, and documents on his relationship with Gandhi, Tagore, Giovanni Gentile, Karl Houshofer, Mircea Eliade, and so on.

A Great Man from Macerata Who Went Far: Giuseppe Tucci - the Marches Region and the East
Images of Earth        and Water: The Tsa-Tsa Votive Tablets of Tibet - Giuseppe Tucci  and Stupa Symbolism
Giuseppe Tucci: A Sketch of Indian Materialism
 Giuseppe Tucci. Facebook page.
 Il Duce's Explorer. Facebook page (in English)
 Giuseppe Tucci l'esploratore del Duce. Facebook page (in Italian)

1894 births
1984 deaths
Buddhist studies scholars
People from Macerata
Italian scholars of Buddhism
Italian orientalists
Italian archaeologists
Italian memoirists
Italian Indologists
Italian fascists
Members of the Royal Academy of Italy
Tibetologists
Visva-Bharati University alumni
Academic staff of Visva-Bharati University
University of Calcutta alumni
Academic staff of the University of Calcutta
Academic staff of the Sapienza University of Rome
People associated with Santiniketan
Italian propagandists
20th-century archaeologists
20th-century memoirists
Corresponding Fellows of the British Academy
Italian sinologists
People related to Lahaul and Spiti district